Alex Oates (born 1987 in Newcastle) is an English playwright from the North East.

Background 

Born in Newcastle, Oates was born to a nurse and police inspector and raised in Whitley Bay in the North East of England. He moved to London to attend Middlesex University in 2006 where he studied Theatre Arts. Oates also studied for a semester at New Paltz where he specialised in dramatic writing under Prof. Laurence Carr.

On graduating Oates was selected to write for EastEnders: E20 and spent time in the story department at EastEnders. Oates was later selected out of thousands for the 2010  Old Vic New Voices 24 hour plays which sparked his career in theatre.

Career 

Oates first play Fan Fiction was produced as a reading at the St. James Theatre directed by Dominic Shaw and starring Iwan Rheon, Russell Tovey and Rebecca Ryan.

Oates then wrote Silk Road for the Edinburgh Fringe (Assembly). Silk Road tackles the issue of buying drugs online and was the first play funded by the digital currency  Bitcoin, it starred James Baxter and was directed by Dominic Shaw.

Oates next play Pig was produced by Silent Uproar productions for Hull Truck Theatre July 2015 and later transferred to the New Diorama Theatre in September 2015. Pig was based on extensive research and interviews with police officers and was about the state of the British police force.

Oates has collaborated with actress Katie Sheridan to create new online romantic comedy, Match Not Found launched October 2015. Oates is also a recipient of the prestigious Peggy Ramsay Legacy grant.

Oates play All In a Row was long listed for the Bruntwood Prize in 2016 and a revised version won the Bolton Octagon's Top Five competition, being selected from 850 plays to receive a rehearsed reading in March 2017.

Following the boom in price of Bitcoin Silk Road was revived for Vault Festival London and Live Theatre Newcastle starring Josh Barrow. To mark the production it was published by Bloomsbury Methuen

Silk Road  transferred into the West End in August 2018 where The Times four star review described it as "Sharp witted, effortlessly engaging and surprisingly sweet".

Oates next play All In A Row proved controversial at Southwark Playhouse for its use of puppetry and brutal take on the themes of severe autism. The Guardian's four star review described it as "a lively, compassionate and darkly humorous show with the unmistakable ring of truth". Oates was nominated for Most Promising Playwright at The Off West End Awards for the play.

Plays 

 Zombie Nation (2011) as part of the 24 hour plays, Old Vic Theatre, directed by Ed Stambolloullan
 Fan Fiction (2012) Rehearsed Reading, St James Theatre, directed by Dominic Shaw
 Silk Road (2014) Assembly Studios, directed by Dominic Shaw
 Hansel (2015) Assemble Fest, Directed by Alex Mitchell
 Pig (2015) Hull Truck and New Diorama, Directed by Alex Mitchell
 Mutations (2016) Pleasance Islington, Reading in association with University of Oxford, directed by Gareth Taylor
 A Memory For Forgetting (2017) Arcola Theatre, The Miniaturists 61, Directed by Dominic Shaw
 All In A Row (2017) Bolton Octagon, Top Five Readings Season, Directed by Ben Occhipinti
 Silk Road (How To Buy Drugs Online)(2018), Vault Festival, Live Theatre , Trafalgar Studios Directed by Dominic Shaw
 Rules For Being A Man  (2018), Norfolk Tour, Directed by Daniel Burgess
 All in a Row  (2019), Southwark Playhouse, Directed by Dominic Shaw
Our Liam of Lourdes (2019), BBC Radio 4, Directed by Jessica Dromgoole
How To Explode (2019), Customs House South Shields, Directed by Fiona Martin

References

Living people
English dramatists and playwrights
English television writers
1987 births